Beethoven's Ninth Symphony CD-ROM was one of the first titles to couple a computer compact disc with an audio CD. This title, a companion to Beethoven's Symphony No. 9, was developed in 1989 by the Voyager Company in Apple Computer's HyperCard, using custom audio XCMDs developed at Voyager. The lead instructor and creative voice was UCLA music instructor Robert Winter.

Beethoven's Ninth Symphony, while offering black and white images on a 512×342 resolution display, offered full 44 kHz stereo audio by controlling an off-the-shelf audio CD in the CD-ROM player.

Historically, Beethoven's Ninth Symphony is of importance as it was an early example of interactive media that reached the consumer market, before the popularization of the Internet or DVDs.

External links
 Article on the history of the Beethoven's Ninth Symphony CD-ROM

Ninth Symphony CD-ROM
1989 software
Compact disc